Mental Block is a Canadian comedy TV series, which premiered September 1, 2003 on YTV. It is created and written by Leila Basen and David Preston and directed by Sean Dwyer and Michael Kennedy.

The show revolves around thirteen-year-old Donovan Mackay. His mom and dad seem to be going through a second adolescence, while he's going through his first. His best friends, Ira and Shelley  don't even register on the "cool meter" at school. His main crush, Chloe, is so far out of his league she doesn't know he's on the team. Luckily, Donovan has four teenagers living inside his head, Sparks, Maynard, Skipper, and RJ. Their mission is to get Donovan through another adventurous and unpredictable day as a teenager in suburban Greenfield Park Junior High. The show is filmed in Montreal, Quebec, Canada.

In the second season, Donovan himself is seen inside his head, and the other kids help advise him instead of directly controlling him. Also Maynard is gone.

The cast
 Justin Bradley as Skipper
 Valérie Chiniara as Zoë
 Alexina Cowan as Shelly Green
 Brittany Drisdelle as Chloe Zimmler
 Stefano Faustini as Ira
 Tod Fennell as McHattie
 Johnny Griffin as RJ
 Erik Knudsen as Donovan Mackay
 Tim Post as Doug Mackay
 Jodie Resther as Sparks
 Mitchell David Rothpan as Maynard

External links
 
 tvtome.com's show servlet

2003 Canadian television series debuts
2004 Canadian television series endings
2000s Canadian teen sitcoms
YTV (Canadian TV channel) original programming
English-language television shows
Television series about families
Television series about teenagers